Hrdinný kapitán Korkorán  (The Heroic Captain Korkorán) is a 1934 Czech comedy film directed by Miroslav Cikán. It stars Vlasta Burian, Jiřina Štěpničková and Milada Smolíková. The film is about a Prague skipper who dreams of commanding ships on the high seas but is stuck with running a small steamboat on the Vltava river.

Cast
 Vlasta Burian - Adam Korkorán
 Jiřina Štěpničková - Irena Svobodová
 Milada Smolíková - Mrs. Broniková
 Theodor Pištěk - Mr. Dlouhý
 Jaroslav Marvan - Inspektor paroplavební spolecnosti
 Svetla Svozilová - Chambermaid
 Čeněk Šlégl - Emeritus admiral Piacci
 Ladislav Hemmer - Secretary
 Eman Fiala - Stoker
 Josef Kotalík - Director of the steam-navigation
 Bohumil Mottl - Vláda
 Karel Nemec - Servant
 Karel Postranecký - Balvan, greaser
 Jan W. Speerger - Rating
 Josef Waltner - Hotel manager

References

External links
 

1934 films
1934 comedy films
Czech black-and-white films
Films directed by Miroslav Cikán
Czech comedy films
Seafaring films
1930s Czech-language films
1930s Czech films